Elizabeth Kim is the pen name of an American journalist who authored the book Ten Thousand Sorrows, which is described as a memoir.

Early life
Kim was born in South Korea to a Korean mother and an American father. She was conceived most likely after the Korean Armistice Agreement, which ended the fighting in the Korean War. According to Kim's memories, her father abandoned her mother, who was forced to return to her hometown alone and pregnant to seek assistance from her family. After Kim's birth, she lived with her mother in a hut at the edge of town, and worked in the rice fields. When Kim was a child, as she remembers it, her mother was killed by her grandfather and uncle in what she would later describe as an "honor killing". Kim herself was left at a Seoul orphanage, with no record of her original name or her family. Eventually, she was adopted by a minister and his wife and given the name Elizabeth.

Ten Thousand Sorrows

Writing and reactions
Kim was working as a journalist at the Marin Independent Journal and living in San Rafael, California, when literary agent Patti Breitman approached her about the possibility of writing a memoir. Kim was initially reluctant, but Breitman slowly convinced her of the idea; Breitman herself says that publishers were quite enthusiastic about the idea, and one even replied to her proposal within a day, simply asking her to "name a price". In the end, Kim received an advance of hundreds of thousands of dollars for her book; when it was published in May 2000, Kim quit her job at the Marin Independent Journal (despite her recent promotion to city editor) to tour in Canada, the United Kingdom, and the United States.

Andrea Behr, writing for the San Francisco Chronicle, praised Kim's writing, comparing her book to Frank McCourt's Angela's Ashes, and stating that "she has the gift of telling her story with such clear-sighted, humble honesty, and such compassion, that it's just as fascinating and compulsively readable as it is devastating". It was also reviewed favorably in O, Oprah Winfrey's magazine. Others were less positive. Salon reviewer Brigitte Frase described Kim's book as "brutal", "haunting and disturbing", and "an act of revenge", ending her review by stating that "I have read it so that you won't have to".

Some critics suspected Kim's book of being fictional rather than autobiographical, with Hillel Italie of Associated Press expressing concern that Kim's vagueness regarding dates and locations prevented the book's facts from being verifiable. It was particularly controversial in the Korean American community, some of whose members accused Kim of "exploiting the issue of biraciality" and "trying to take advantage of the [then] current interest in autobiographies, particularly those that involved violence against women". Others objected to the description of her mother's murder as an "honor killing" as being inconsistent with Korean culture. However, Korean American writer Kim Sun-jung defended the book, criticizing B. R. Myers, who lambasted what he described as the book's "ludicrous inaccuracies" about Korean culture, because Myers himself was not Korean.

Reviews 
 Koji Nnamdi, WAMU
 Seiwoong Oh, Western American Literature
 Susan Soon-Keum Cox, Adoption Quarterly
 Tracy Dianne Wood, Ph.D. dissertation, U.C. Riverside

Editions and translations
Ten Thousand Sorrows was published in the following editions:

Audiobook (read by the author): 
United Kingdom edition: 

It was translated into eleven languages. The below list gives unofficial translations of the foreign-language titles where the original title was not preserved.
Chinese: 
Dutch: 
Danish: 
Finnish: 
German: 
Hungarian: 
Korean: 
Turkish: 
Italian: 
Japanese: 
Polish: 

Further editions were published in two of those languages:
German paperback: 
Hungarian paperback:

References

Living people
1954 births
South Korean emigrants to the United States
American writers of Korean descent
American women journalists
American adoptees
South Korean adoptees
Writers from San Rafael, California
21st-century American women